Kotfin can mean:
 Kotfin, Łódź Voivodeship
 Kotfin, Masovian Voivodeship